Chiprovtsi Municipality is a small frontier municipality (obshtina) in Montana Province, Northwestern Bulgaria, located on the northern slopes of western Stara Planina mountain and the area of the so-called Fore-Balkan. It is named after its administrative centre - the town of Chiprovtsi. In the southwest, the municipality borders on Republic of Serbia.

The area embraces a territory of 286.8 km2 with a population of 3,657 inhabitants, as of February 2011.

Settlements 

Chiprovtsi Municipality includes the following 10 places (towns are shown in bold):

Geography 
Chiprovtsi Municipality is located in the western part of Montana Province. To the east, Chiprovtsi municipality borders Montana and Georgi Damyanovo municipalities of the same province; its southern neighbour is also Georgi Damyanovo. To the west are the Serbian border and Chuprene municipality of Vidin Province and to the north is Ruzhintsi municipality of Vidin Province. Besides the town, the municipality includes nine villages, namely Belimel, Chelyustnitsa, Gorna Kovachitsa, Gorna Luka, Martinovo, Mitrovtsi, Prevala, Ravna and Zhelezna.

Chiprovtsi municipality falls in the humid continental climate climate zone, with a slight mountain influence. The average yearly precipitation is 776–816 millimetres. The spring is short and rainy, while the summer is generally hot and dry. In the winter, the area is subject to a strong northeastern wind and a temperature inversion in the valleys.

Of the 38 rivers and rivulets that flow across the municipality, the most important are the Ogosta and the Prevalska. There is a water reservoir near Martinovo and a hydroelectric plant at Zhelezna. There are no mineral springs in the municipality. Chiprovtsi municipality is home to 1,250 species of plants, including a large number of herbs and deciduous trees; some of the trees are 150–300 years old.

The remaining 1.05% are composed of water areas, mines and infrastructure.

Demographics

On 31 July 2005, Chiprovtsi municipality's population was 4,810; 2,375 people were from the town itself—1,167 men and 1,208 women. By June 2008, the town's population had declined to 2,122. According to 2005 data, the largest village in the municipality is Prevala with a population of 585; the smallest is Ravna with 68. The ethnic composition of the municipality is homogeneous; 4,722 people or 99.21% identify themselves as Bulgarians and 38 people or 0.79% as Roma. Of the Roma, three quarters live in the Barzan neighbourhood of Martinovo and arrived from around Asenovgrad, the rest are residents of Chelyustnitsa and descend from Berkovitsa.

Since 1956, the municipality has experienced population ageing and rural depopulation, as many people have migrated to larger cities such as Montana, Vidin, Vratsa and Sofia. The ratio of urban to rural population is 49.37% to 50.63%, indicating an almost equal distribution between the town of Chiprovtsi and the surrounding villages. As of 2005, the unemployment in the municipality is 23.5%,  much higher than the Bulgarian average of 7.75% according to 2007 data.

Since 2004 the population of the municipality has declined: 2005 = 4,198, 2007 = 3,955, 2009 = 3,719, 2011 = 3,657
The population declined further to 3,219 people at the end of 2017.

Religion 
According to the latest Bulgarian census of 2011, the religious composition, among those who answered the optional question on religious identification, was the following:

Governance
The municipal government consists of a mayor (kmet), a deputy mayor and a secretary. Since 2007, the municipality has been governed by Zaharin Ivanov Zamfirov of Bulgarian Agrarian People's Union "Aleksandar Stamboliyski" who won the municipal elections with 1,615 votes or 62.67% against Antoaneta Todorova Kostova of the Bulgarian Socialist Party who amassed 962 votes or 37.33%. Two villages in the municipality are eligible to elect their own mayor, Prevala and Zhelezna.

The municipal administration is divided into two branches, the common and specialized administration. The common administration is further divided into the "Information Services" and "Financial-economical Activities and Handling of Property" departments; the specialized administration includes the "Planning and Distribution of the Budget" and "Territorial and Village Planning and Building" departments. The municipality has no separate court or prosecutor's office and is instead serviced by the Montana provincial court and office. The local police station is subordinate to the one in Montana. There is a Municipal Land Commission, part of the Ministry of Agriculture and Forestry, and a Municipal Social Service. The Municipal Land Commission takes care of land and forest distribution and the Municipal Social Service oversees financial aid and supports the disabled.

See also
Provinces of Bulgaria
Municipalities of Bulgaria
List of cities and towns in Bulgaria

References

External links
 Official website